Heather McLean (born January 4, 1993) is a Canadian speed skater who is specialized in the sprint distances.

Career
McLean won her first World Cup medal in November 2015 at the World Cup stop in Calgary when she finished third in the women's team sprint event. In December, she won her first medal in a singles event when she finished third in the women's 500 m event in Inzell.  She is coached by Kevin Crockett.

2018 Winter Olympics
McLean qualified to compete for Canada at the 2018 Winter Olympics.

Personal records

References

External links

Speed Skating Canada profile 

1993 births
Living people
Canadian female speed skaters
Speed skaters from Winnipeg
Speed skaters at the 2018 Winter Olympics
Speed skaters at the 2022 Winter Olympics
Olympic speed skaters of Canada
World Single Distances Speed Skating Championships medalists